Let's Be Friends is a compilation album by American singer and musician Elvis Presley, released by RCA Records CAS 2408, in April 1970. It is the second Presley budget album to appear on the low-priced RCA Camden label. It peaked at number 105 on the Billboard 200 album chart. It was certified Gold on June 15, 1999 and Platinum on January 6, 2004 by the Recording Industry Association of America.

Content
Similar to its predecessor Elvis Sings Flaming Star, Let's Be Friends collects mostly unreleased songs recorded for Presley film soundtracks. Given the recent work of the revitalized Presley, in the past the Colonel might have objected to this kind of market saturation, but under the terms of Presley's agreement with RCA, budget albums brought extra cash outside of contract stipulations.

Two non-movie outtakes appeared from the winter of 1969 sessions at American Sound Studio in Memphis, "I'll Be There" and "If I'm a Fool (For Loving You)". "Mama" was sung in the film Girls! Girls! Girls! by The Amigos and Presley's version first appeared on this album, with an alternate, abridged version included on the compact disc Elvis Double Features: Kid Galahad/Girls! Girls! Girls!. "Let's Forget About the Stars" had been recorded for the film Charro!, but cut from the picture. "Almost" was one of only two tracks from The Trouble with Girls to see release in Presley's lifetime. Three tracks, "Let's Be Friends", "Change of Habit", and "Have a Happy", originated from Presley's then-current film Change of Habit, thus casting the album in the additional role as soundtrack LP for the film (two additional tracks from the movie, "Rubberneckin'" and "Let Us Pray", are omitted, the former being released on a single in 1969 and the latter held until the 1971 budget collection You'll Never Walk Alone).

Like all Presley releases on the budget RCA Camden label, this album has a very short running time, too short for a full-priced album in the 1970s. It 1975, it was re-issued by Pickwick Records with the original RCA Camden catalog #CAS 2408 and with a black border around the original cover art.  It was reissued for compact disc by Sony/RCA in 2006.

Track listing

See also
 Elvis for Everyone 1965 album

References

External links

1970 compilation albums
Elvis Presley compilation albums
RCA Camden compilation albums